Taivo Kuus (born 6 June 1969) is an Estonian cross-country skier. He competed at the 1992 Winter Olympics and the 1994 Winter Olympics.

References

1969 births
Living people
Estonian male cross-country skiers
Olympic cross-country skiers of Estonia
Cross-country skiers at the 1992 Winter Olympics
Cross-country skiers at the 1994 Winter Olympics
Sportspeople from Võru
20th-century Estonian people